{{DISPLAYTITLE:C15H17N}}
The molecular formula C15H17N (molar mass: 211.30 g/mol, exact mass: 211.1361 u) may refer to:

 2,2-Diphenylpropylamine
 2,3-Diphenylpropylamine
 3,3-Diphenylpropylamine

Molecular formulas